This is the first edition of the tournament.

Qualifier Markéta Vondroušová won her first WTA title at the age of 17 in only her second appearance in a WTA main draw, defeating Anett Kontaveit in the final, 6–4, 7–6(8–6). Ranked no. 233, Vondroušová became the second-lowest ranked player (at the time) ever to win a WTA singles title.

Seeds

Draw

Finals

Top half

Bottom half

Qualifying

Seeds

Qualifiers

Lucky losers
  Lina Gjorcheska

Draw

First qualifier

Second qualifier

Third qualifier

Fourth qualifier

References
Main Draw
Qualifying Draw

Ladies Open Biel Bienne - Singles
Ladies Open Lugano
Lugano